Poznań Voivodeship was a unit of administrative division and local government in Poland in the years 1919–1939, created after World War I from the Prussian-German province of Poznań (Province of Posen). The borders were changed in 1939: the city of Bydgoszcz passed to the Pomeranian Voivodeship, but some eastern areas were included (see Territorial changes of Polish Voivodeships on April 1, 1938).

During World War II, it was occupied by Nazi Germany and annexed as Reichsgau Wartheland "(Reich province of the Land of the Warta River)".

Area and counties 

Between April 1, 1938 and September 1, 1939, the Voivodeship's area was 28 089 km2, and its population - 2 339 600 (according to the 1931 Polish census). It consisted of 29 powiats (the highest number in Poland, however, most of them were very small, both in area and population), 100 towns (the highest number in Poland) and 237 villages. Railroad density was high, with 10.1 km. per 100 km2 (total length of railroads within the Voivodeship's area was 2684 km, the highest in the whole country). Forests covered 19.8% of the Voivodeship, which was lower than the national average (in 1937 the average was 22.2%).

Poznańskie Voivodeship was one of the richest and best developed in interwar Poland. With numerous cities and well-developed rail, it also was a breadbasket of the country, its highly efficient agriculture was well-mechanized. The city of Poznań was a big industrial center, as well as a key railroad junction. Only 7.6% of population was illiterate, which was much lower than the national average of 23.1% (as of 1931). Poles made up the majority of the population (90.5%), with 7.4% Germans and 1.9% Jews.

After World War I the number of Germans was 224,254 in 1926 and 203,135 in 1934.

This is the list of the Poznań Voivodeship counties as for August 31, 1939:

 Chodzież county (area 893 km2, pop. 44 500),
 Czarnków county (area 919 km2, pop. 43 300),
 city of Gniezno county (area 18 km2, pop. 30 700),
 Gniezno county (area 1 126 km2, pop. 57 300),
 Gostyń county (area 701 km2, pop. 55 900),
 Jarocin county (area 1 124 km2, pop. 87 500),
 Kalisz county (area 1 478 km2, pop. 196 700),
 Kępno county (area 1 179 km2, pop. 86 900),
 Koło county (area 1 097 km2, pop. 109 800),
 Konin county (area 2 152 km2, pop. 168 000),
 Kościan county (area 1 057 km2, pop. 78 900),
 Krotoszyn county (area 915 km2, pop. 75 500),
 Leszno county (area 827 km2, pop. 61 200),
 Międzychód county (area 755 km2, pop. 31 000),
 Mogilno county (area 1 059 km2, pop. 70 300),
 Nowy Tomyśl county (area 1 276 km2, pop. 87 300),
 Oborniki county (area 966 km2, pop. 50 400),
 Ostrów Wielkopolski county (area 1 194 km2, pop. 104 100),
 city of Poznań county (area 77 km2, pop. 246 500),
 Poznań county (area 1 227 km2, pop. 91 200),
 Rawicz county (area 523 km2, pop. 49 900),
 Szamotuły county (area 1 076 km2, pop. 67 700),
 Środa Wielkopolska county (area 800 km2, pop. 49 900),
 Śrem county (area 921 km2, pop. 57 300),
 Turek county (area 1 591 km2, pop. 130 500),
 Wągrowiec county (area 1 037 km2, pop. 54 300),
 Wolsztyn county (area 754 km2, pop. 47 900),
 Września county (area 608 km2, pop. 43 700),
 Żnin county (area 739 km2, pop. 41 500).

Main cities 

The biggest cities of the Voivodeship were (data according to the 1931 census):

 Poznań (pop. 246 500),
 Kalisz (pop. 68 300),
 Gniezno (pop. 30 700),
 Ostrów Wielkopolski (pop. 24 400),
 Leszno (pop. 19 400),
 Koło (pop. 13 800)
 Krotoszyn (pop. 13 000),
 Konin (pop. 10 300).

German minority 

According to Polish census in 1921 there were 16.7% Germans in Polish areas (327 846 overall) and 9.2% in 1931 (193 044 overall).

Voivodes 

Wojciech Trąmpczyński 1 August 1919 – 23 October 1919
Witold Celichowski 1 August 1919 – 2 January 1923
Adolf Bniński 10 January 1923 – 9 May 1928
Piotr Dunin-Borkowski 9 May 1928 – 11 October 1929
Roger Adam Raczyński 11 October 1929 – 31 July 1934
Stanisław Kaucki 1 August 1934 – 15 January 1935 (acting)
Artur Maruszewski 16 June 1935 – 23 June 1935
Mikołaj Kwaśniewski 26 June 1935 – 13 September 1935
Tadeusz Walicki 19 September 1935 – 29 October 1935 (acting)
Artur Maruszewski 29 October 1935 – 19 May 1939
Ludwik Bociański 19 May 1939 – 12 September 1939
Cyryl Ratajski 4 September 1939 – 12 September 1939 (acting)

See also 
Poland's current Greater Poland and Kuyavian-Pomeranian Voivodeships
Territorial changes of Polish Voivodeships on April 1, 1938

Notes

References 
 Maly rocznik statystyczny 1939, Nakladem Glownego Urzedu Statystycznego, Warszawa 1939 (Concise Statistical Year-Book of Poland, Warsaw 1939).

 
Former voivodeships of the Second Polish Republic